The Samsung E1195 is an affordable flip phone. It is also known as GT-E1195.

Standard features
Alarm, Calendar, FM Radio, Game, Screen Torch Light, Timer, Stopwatch, Calculator, Converter.

References

E1195
Mobile phones introduced in 2011